The House Next Door is a 2006 Lifetime Television film, directed by Jeff Woolnough and starring Mark-Paul Gosselaar, Lara Flynn Boyle and Colin Ferguson. The film is based on the 1978 novel of the same name by Anne Rivers Siddons

Plot
The peaceful and happy life of Walker and Col Kennedy is interrupted when Kim, a brilliant and attractive male architect, builds a dream house next to theirs. All the people who move into the house turn evil or end up having "accidents" and unexplainable deaths. They realize that the house targets their fears and feeds off of them until it drives them insane. In the end, the Kennedys succeed in destroying the house, killing the architect in the process. In the final scene another couple is seen eyeing a new house identical to the old one. This is the greatest departure from the novel, in which the Kennedys kill the architect before trying to destroy the house – in the epilogue it is revealed that they themselves lost their lives and the house is still intact.

Cast
 Lara Flynn Boyle as Col Kennedy
 Colin Ferguson as Walker Kennedy
 Noam Jenkins as Norman Greene
 Julie Stewart as Anita
 Heather Hanson as Claire
 Charlotte Sullivan as Pie Harrelson
 Natalie Lisinska as Eloise
 Heidi von Palleske as Virginia Guthrie
 Aidan Devine as Buck
 Stephen Amell as Buddy Harrelson
 Peter MacNeill
 Mark-Paul Gosselaar as Kim
 Emma Campbell as Suzannah Greene
 Niamh Wilson as Belinda Greene
 Scott Gibson as Roger
 Trevor Bain as Tyler
 Evan Williams as Toby
 Michael Scratch as Josh
 Megan Vincent as Natalie
 Kasia Vassos as Chrissie
 Sean Orr as Charles
 Victoria Fodor as Client
 Jef Mallory as Courier
 Sal Scozzari as TV Installer
 Ben Lewis as Pizza Boy

Release
The film premiered on 30 October 2006 at Lifetime in the United States and was released of DVD in Germany on 29 May 2007.

Awards
Niamh Wilson was nominated as Best Supporting Actress for a Young Artist Award.

Critical reception

The House Next Door was seen as "uninspired" by critics.

References

External links

 
The House Next Door at LifetimeMovieClub

2006 films
2006 horror films
2006 television films
2000s mystery films
American horror thriller films
American mystery films
Films about death
Films based on American horror novels
Lifetime (TV network) films
Television shows based on American novels
American horror television films
Films directed by Jeff Woolnough
2000s English-language films
2000s American films